The Literarische Donaugesellschaft ( Danubian Literary Society ) was an important literary association founded in 1893 by Guido von List and Fanny Wschiansky.

It was formed when Iduna dissolved in 1893.

Guido von List
Austrian writers' organisations